The Polish Armed Forces (German: Polnische Wehrmacht) was a military formation created during World War I. It was created from the more Polish dominated, Polish Auxiliary Crops (also called Polish Legions), headed by Pilsudski. It was the armed forces of a puppet Kingdom of Poland envisioned by the Prussian Mitteleuropa Plan. The results of the recruiting campaign were dismal. The German Polska Siła Zbrojna was nevertheless established, as part of the German Army and under complete German command. The commander-in-chief of the Polska Siła Zbrojna became general-governor Hans Hartwig von Beseler, while the de facto commander was General der Infanterie Felix von Barth, head of the training branch.

The Polska Siła Zbrojna was created on 10 April 1917, as a result of the Act of 5th November of 1916 and the creation of the Kingdom of Poland. The backbone of the formation were the soldiers of the Polish Legions (Polish Auxiliary Corps), fighting together with the Austro-Hungarian Army against Russia.

As a result of the Oath Crisis of July 1917, 1/4 of the soldiers of the Polish Legions declined to pledge loyalty to the German Kaiser. Approximately 15,000 of them were confined in internment camps in Beniaminów and Szczypiorno, while almost 3,000 were drafted to the Austro-Hungarian Army. Despite the planned force of 70,000, only 5,000 declared loyalty to the kaiser. After the command of the unit was transferred to the Polish Regency Council on 19 October 1918, the number soon reached 9,000. After Poland declared her independence on 11 November 1918, the Polnische Wehrmacht became the basis of the newly formed Polish Army.

See also
 Polish Legions in World War I

References

Infantry divisions of Germany in World War I
Military units and formations established in 1917
Military units and formations disestablished in 1918
Military history of Poland
Poland in World War I
Germany–Poland relations
Kingdom of Poland (1917–1918)
Military units and formations of Poland in World War I